WASP-85 Ab is an exoplanet that orbits WASP-85 A, a star that is part of a binary system. WASP-85 Ab's mass and radius indicate that it has a bulk composition like that of Jupiter. Unlike Jupiter, and similar to other gas giants, it orbits very close to its star, and is classified as a hot Jupiter.

See also
Extrasolar planet
Hot Jupiter
Kepler-447b

References

External links
 

Hot Jupiters
Exoplanets discovered by WASP
Virgo (constellation)
Exoplanets discovered in 2015